Big Cypress is a future planned town in Collier County, Florida. The project, originally called Rural Lands West, is being developed by Collier Enterprises and will consist of three villages, Rivergrass, Longwater, and Bellmar.

The town will be named after nearby Big Cypress National Preserve.

Geography

Big Cypress will be east of Golden Gate Estates and southwest of Ave Maria.

Much of the land being used for the development is currently used for row crops.

Villages
Rivergrass

The first of the three villages to be approved by the Collier County Planning Commission (2020), the  development will be located off of Oil Well Road in what is currently Immokalee, Florida.

Longwater

The  planned village, to be east of Desoto Boulevard N and south of Oil Well Road, is the second of the three villages to be approved. Of the nearly 1,000 acres, more than 260 are to be dedicated to lakes.

Bellmar

The village was approved by the Collier County Planning Commission in 2021.

Controversy
The three Big Cypress villages will be within the environmentally sensitive Rural Lands Stewardship Area (RLSA).

Major concerns surround the development's impact on the endangered Florida panther. According to wildlife experts, the project will destroy around 2,000 acres of land that are essential for the continued survival of the already declining population.

References

External Links  
 Town of Big Cypress - Site Map

Planned communities in Florida
Proposed populated places in the United States